Head of State is a 2003 American political comedy film directed, written by, and starring Chris Rock and co-starring Bernie Mac. It marked the directorial debut of Rock, who had previously worked as a writer, producer, and actor.

The film's title refers to one of the key functions of the President of the United States, as the American head of state. This was the last film by cinematographer Donald E. Thorin, who died in 2016, having not worked on a film in thirteen years.

Plot
Mays Gilliam is the alderman for the 9th Ward in Washington, D.C. After learning he is likely to lose his job and getting dumped by his girlfriend, Kim, Gilliam is unexpectedly chosen as the Democratic Party candidate for the 2004 presidential election after his party's original presidential and vice-presidential nominees die in a plane crash and he is lauded as a hero for saving a woman from an explosion. Assuming the election was already lost to incumbent Republican vice-president Brian Lewis, the Democrats decided to pick a likable but unwinnable minority candidate to improve their chances in the 2008 presidential election.

At first, Gilliam feels he will not be able to succeed as President because he would be representing the entire African-American populace, and does not want to do anything to damage his reputation. However, Gilliam begins to rise in the polls after his brother Mitch persuades him to speak out for what he believes in. He ditches the bland, boring, and uncontroversial speeches prepared for him and begins to talk honestly about major issues such as welfare, healthcare, income inequality, and society overall.

After Lewis runs a series of attack ads including one saying Gilliam supports cancer, Gilliam begins to fight back using what he claimed was "kissing" his opponent (taken from Bugs Bunny–Elmer Fudd cartoons). A part of this strategy includes dubbing a videotape of Osama bin Laden saying he hates America but loves Brian Lewis. This strategy gains Gilliam even more points in the polls.

As election day draws closer, Gilliam eventually learns the reason why he was chosen as the party candidate, fires some disloyal campaign operatives (despite them having reconciled with him afterwards), and chooses his brother as his running mate. He later has a debate with his opponent in which he manages to win the crowd over by speaking truth about American life. Finally, Gilliam ends up winning the presidency, and proposes to Lisa by saying he wants to make her his First Lady.

Cast
Chris Rock as Mays Gilliam, alderman, reluctant Presidential candidate and later President of the United States.
Bernie Mac as Mitch Gilliam, elder brother of Mays, Vice Presidential candidate and later Vice President of the United States.
Dylan Baker as Martin Geller
Nick Searcy as Brian Lewis, incumbent Vice President of the United States and Presidential candidate.
Lynn Whitfield as Debra Lassiter
Robin Givens as Kim, the psychotic ex-girlfriend of Mays who tries to win him back after his nomination but is taken away by security. 
Tamala Jones as Lisa Clark
James Rebhorn as Senator Bill Arnot
Keith David as Bernard Cooper
Stephanie March as Nikki, executive director of Internal Liaison
Jeremy Borash as Wrestling announcer
Ron Killings as Himself
Nate Dogg as Himself
Tracy Morgan as Meat Hustler
Ron Harris as Wrestler (uncredited)
Jeff Jarrett as Himself
B. G. James as Himself

Production
Rock said in HBO First Look that he got the idea from the 1984 Democratic presidential nominee Walter Mondale, who chose Geraldine Ferraro—a woman—as his running mate. The Democrats knew they had little chance of defeating Ronald Reagan, but selected Ferraro in hopes of gaining female support.

In one scene, Gilliam quotes "The Roof Is on Fire" by Rock Master Scott & the Dynamic Three.

According to the DVD audio commentary, the scene where Gilliam sings "Deep in the Heart of Texas" is a reference to Pee-wee's Big Adventure, where Pee-Wee Herman does the same thing.

Part of the presidential debate is a verbatim repeat of Monty Python's Argument Clinic.

Cameos
 The ceremonial first pitch scene was filmed prior to a Baltimore Orioles–Toronto Blue Jays game at Camden Yards on August 24, 2002.
 In the scene where Gilliam makes an appearance for TNA Wrestling, B. G. James is holding the NWA World Heavyweight Championship, a title he has never won.
 Boston comedian and actor Jimmy Tingle has the role of a talk show host, in which he interviews Bernie Mac.

Reception
Head of State received generally mixed reviews from critics. On Rotten Tomatoes, the film maintains a score of 30% approval rating from critics, with the critical consensus reading, "Head of State squanders its potentially ripe premise with watered-down satire and formulaic gags." On Metacritic, the film maintains a score of 44/100.

Roger Ebert, writing for Chicago Sun-Times, gave the film 3/4 stars, writing that it's "an imperfect movie, but not a boring one and not lacking in intelligence."

References

External links

 
 
 
 
 

2003 films
2000s political comedy films
American political comedy films
American political satire films
African-American comedy films
2003 directorial debut films
DreamWorks Pictures films
Films about elections
Films directed by Chris Rock
Films set in Washington, D.C.
Films shot in South Dakota
Films shot in Baltimore
Films about fictional presidents of the United States
Films with screenplays by Chris Rock
Films produced by Chris Rock
3 Arts Entertainment films
Films with screenplays by Ali LeRoi
Films produced by Ali LeRoi
2000s English-language films
2000s American films